GK Partners are business and development advisers and consultants based in the United Kingdom. It was registered as an independent UK company in 2004 by Gibril Faal and Katharine Ford, who are co-directors and principal advisers. 

GK Partners provides business advice, policy guidance and strategic support to commercial, governmental and charitable organisations. GK They work with social enterprises commercial enterprises public institutions and international institutions

GK Partners' services include specialist programmes on Access to Finance (A2F), Access to Property (A2P), Finance for Development (F4D) and Policy for Development (P4D).

Faal and Ford met in 2001 while working on a social enterprise business support system under the auspices of the UK Department of Trade and Industry (DTI) 

GK Partners has worked with the Business and Intellectual Property Centre of the British Library, and financial institutions such as Triodos Bank and Charity Bank. The company had inputs in the negotiations and formulation of the 2015 Sustainable Development Goals and the Financing for Development agreements. GK Partners also provided evidence to the House of Commons International Development Committee on 'SDGs and Business' in October 2015.

References

Consulting firms established in 2004
Social enterprises
Management consulting firms of the United Kingdom